SS Henry Watterson was a Liberty ship built in the United States during World War II. She was named after Henry Watterson, an American journalist, partial term US Congressman from Kentucky, and Pulitzer Prize winner in 1918, for two editorials supporting U.S. entry into World War I.

Construction
Henry Watterson was laid down on 19 April 1943, under a Maritime Commission (MARCOM) contract, MC hull 1201, by the St. Johns River Shipbuilding Company, Jacksonville, Florida; she was sponsored by Mrs. Jack E. Schmeltzer, the widow of the former Technical Assistant to Rear Admiral Howard L. Vickery, MARCOM, she was launched on 21 July 1943.

History
She was allocated to American Export Lines Inc., on 18 August 1943. On 11 May 1946, she was placed in the James River Reserve Fleet, Lee Hall, Virginia. She was sold for commercial use, on 24 June 1947, to A/S Lundegaard and Soenner, renamed Spurt and flagged in Norway. She was withdrawn from the fleet, 7 July 1947. On 13 December 1961, while operating as Spartan and flagged in Lebanon, she ran aground in Pasa Buenavista, Cuba. After being refloated, she was towed to Havana, on 29 May 1962. She was declared a constructive total loss (CTL) and scrapped.

References

Bibliography

 
 
 
 

 

Liberty ships
Ships built in Jacksonville, Florida
1943 ships
James River Reserve Fleet
Maritime incidents in 1961